Ramón Fernando Núñez Reyes (born 14 November 1985) is an international footballer who last played for the Mesquite Outlaws in the Major Arena Soccer League. Núñez plays primarily as an attacking midfielder. He can also play as a winger or as a second striker. In his homeland he is nicknamed El Principito meaning The Little Prince.

Club career

Early career
Born in Tegucigalpa, Honduras, Núñez grew up in the United States, coming with his family on his father's investor visa in the early 1990s and graduating from W. T. White High School in Dallas, Texas. He was drafted by the Dallas Burn sixth overall in the 2004 MLS SuperDraft after one season of college soccer at Southern Methodist University for which he was named the Missouri Valley Conference freshman of the year.

MLS career

In his first year with the Dallas Burn (which later changed their name to FC Dallas), Núñez saw very limited action, playing a total of 107 minutes in eight games. However, he came on strong at the end of his second season, earning a starting role and finishing with five league goals and three assists. After losing a starting spot, he transferred to Chivas USA in August 2007. He was released on a free transfer at the end of the season.

Deportivo Olimpia
Soon after, Ramón joined Olimpia of Honduras where he made 34 appearances, finding the net three times. He was a key player in Olimpia's lineup and played mostly as an attacking midfielder, providing several assists. He was renowned for his extraordinary vision and was instrumental in Los Leones's 2007/08 Clausura triumph, his performances also securing him the player of the season award.

Puebla
Núñez's excellent form with Olimpia and with the Honduras national football team led to him signing on loan for six months at Mexican Primera División side Puebla. He scored his first goal with Puebla on 18 February 2009 against C.F. Pachuca. He continued to score for 'La Franja' since then and brought his goal tally up to five goals. He also created five assists throughout the season.

Cruz Azul
His performances on loan for Puebia earned Núñez a move to Cruz Azul for the 2009–2010 season, where he scored two goals in the CONCACAF Champions League. He left the club after six months after not making the same sort of impression he made at Puebia. He decided to return to Honduras so he could get regular games to guarantee his spot in the 2010 Honduras World Cup Squad.

C.D. Olimpia
Núñez returned to Honduras after leaving Mexico, where he re-joined the nation's most successful side in C.D. Olimpia where he scored 5 goals in 11 games for them. After his 6-month contract ended, Núñez wanted to try his luck in Europe after turning down offers to join Mexican Premier League clubs. After becoming a free agent, he left Olimpia to join Leeds initially on a trial basis before signing a permanent contract.

Leeds United
In August 2010, Núñez joined English club Leeds United on trial. Núñez scored in his first game for the club in a pre-season friendly victory against Bradford Park Avenue. After impressing manager Simon Grayson during his trial, Núñez's trial period was extended at Leeds by a further week. On 31 August 2010, Núñez signed a professional contract with Leeds United until January 2011, when there is an option to extend the contract even further. On 14 September, in order to gain match fitness, Núñez played 90 minutes in Leeds' 3–1 behind closed doors friendly win against Middlesbrough. Núñez put in an impressive performance, scoring a goal and gaining an assist for Mike Grella. Núñez revealed on 23 September, that he was eligible to play for Leeds' first team after going to New York to get a green light on the necessary paperwork.

On 28 September, Núñez was named on the bench for Leeds against Preston North End and against Ipswich Town. He made his debut as a second-half substitute against Cardiff City, as Leeds were comprehensively beaten 4–0 at home. Núñez came on as a second-half substitute against Scunthorpe United. On 1 January 2011, manager Grayson revealed that Núñez might get a new contract despite not playing many games.

On 13 January, Núñez signed a new contract extension with Leeds until the end of the 2010–11 season. The extension also includes the option of a further year on the contract.

Despite the new contract and some impressive performances for Leeds United's reserve team (including all four goals in the 4–1 victory of Lincoln City on 7 March), Núñez struggled for chances in the Leeds United first team, making do with a place on the bench and a regular spot in Leeds' reserves.

Leeds chose to exercise the option on Núñez's contract and the midfielder has extended his stay at Elland Road for another year.

Scunthorpe loan
On 24 March, he joined Scunthorpe United on loan in order to get some more experience in English football. On 2 April, Núñez made his debut in the 6-0 thrashing by Norwich at Carrow Road on 2 April 2011, however after a sending off to a Scunthorpe player Núñez was substituted in the first half. He scored his first goal for Scunthorpe against Crystal Palace on 16 April 2011. After impressing in his first month, Núñez's loan was extended until the end of the season. Núñez's impressive form continued when he scored an important equaliser for Scunthorpe against Coventry City on 22 April, after the game manager Alan Knill revealed when he signed Núñez he first spoke to him in pidgin English only for Núñez to speak back to him in his broad American accent.

Núñez won a penalty for Scunthorpe against Nottingham Forest, however Scunthorpe lost the match 5-1 and were relegated to League One. Núñez capped a productive loan spell when he scored his third goal of the season in the final match of the season against Portsmouth.

Return to Leeds
After his spell on loan at Scunthorpe, Núñez signed a new contract at Leeds on 9 May 2011. After playing five games for Honduras over the summer in the CONCACAF Gold Cup, Núñez was given extra time off before returning to Leeds for pre season training. Núñez played a part in Leeds' 2011 pre-season matches scoring against Falkirk when his cross was turned in for an own goal in Leeds 2–0 pre-season victory, following this impressive performance up with a goal against Motherwell. He also scored a late equaliser in the 1–1 draw with Norwegian club Sandefjord Fotball.

Núñez was given the number 20 shirt for Leeds United. He came on as a substitute for Leeds the opening day of the season as they crashed to a 3–1 defeat against Southampton. Núñez scored his first goals for Leeds with a brace against Bradford City in the League Cup 3–2 win on 9 August. Núñez made his first ever league start for Leeds on 16 August against Hull City, and scored his 3rd goal of the season during the match- his first league goal for the club. Núñez scored his 4th and 5th goals of the season against Doncaster Rovers in the League Cup on 23 August. After the sale of Max Gradel, Núñez came into the starting lineup against Crystal Palace on 10 September. Núñez dropped to the bench in place of Andy Keogh against Manchester United, he came on as a second-half substitute and managed to miss one of Leeds' best scoring chances late on in the game.

On 11 October 2011, Núñez signed a new four-year deal with an option of a fifth year with Leeds United. Despite this, he was transfer listed by Neil Warnock at the end of the 2011–12 season. After being put on the transfer list by Leeds, Núñez was linked with a move to Yorkshire Rivals Doncaster Rovers and newly promoted Charlton Athletic. Núñez was not allocated a squad number for the 2012–13 season on 3 August.

Núñez suffered a cruciate ligament injury on 3 September during Leeds United development squad's victory against Wigan. The injury would rule him out for the season and hinder his chances of a move away from the club.

Núñez had his contract mutually terminated on 29 January 2013.

Alajuelense
On 11 June 2014, Ramón's signing with Alajuelense was made public. He was released from the team on 12 November due to disciplinary issues.

International career
Núñez was part of the U-20 Honduras national football team at the 2005 World Youth Championship in the Netherlands. In October 2006, Núñez was called up to the senior Honduras national football team for the first time. He made his début for the national side on 9 September 2007 coming in as a substitute in a match against Costa Rica. Ramón made his second and third appearances in September after being called up by Reinaldo Rueda to play in the CONCACAF World Cup Qualifiers. In 2008, Núñez appeared for the U-23 Honduras side at the Men's Olympic Football Tournament in Beijing. Ramón Núñez scored two goals for the Honduras national football team after the team was down one goal against Canada on 6 September 2008 to defeat the squad 2–1. Four days later he found the net again in Honduras' 2–0 match against Jamaica.

Núñez was named in the Honduras 2010 World Cup squad and was given the number 7 shirt, He played in all three of Honduras' games at the 2010 World Cup in South Africa. Honduras failed to progress beyond the group stages, with Spain and Chile qualifying for the next stage.

After joining Leeds, Núñez was called up for the Honduras national side to play in a friendly against Guatemala Núñez managed to win his 35th cap in the game and managed to create a goal in Honduras' 2–0 win Núñez was called up to play against Panama before Christmas. He was then called up for Honduras to play Costa Rica and Guatemala in the Copa América games. 15 January, Núñez scored against Costa Rica in injury time to earn Honduras a 1–1 draw. Núñez scored in his second successive game by scoring in Honduras' win against Guatemala. On 23 January, Núñez played in the 2011 Copa Centroamericana final and helped Honduras win the tournament after beating Costa Rica 2–1. Núñez won the award for best player of the tournament when he won the MVP. On 21 March, Núñez was called up into the Honduras squad.

In June 2011, Núñez played for Honduras in the CONCACAF Gold Cup, he was used as an impact player and came on as a substitute in each of the first four games. Nunez denied on his Twitter page that he had critisced the Honduras manager Luis Fernando Suárez after the 1–1 match against Guatemala in the Gold Cup. Honduras played Mexico in the semi-final of the Gold Cup with Núñez making his fifth appearance of the tournament as a substitute. However, Mexico beat Honduras 2–0 in extra time to reach the final.

Núñez revealed in August 2011 he turned down a call up for Honduras to feature against Venezuela as it meant he would miss Leeds match against Bradford City. Núñez started against Bradford and scored his first two goals for Leeds.

Honours and awards
Club
C.D. Olimpia
Liga Profesional de Honduras (1): 2007–08 C

Country
Honduras
Copa Centroamericana (1): 2011

Personal
Olimpia: Player of the season 2007–08
Southern Methodist University: Missouri Valley Conference 2003 Freshman of the Year
Honduras: Copa Centroamericana MVP 2011

Career statistics

International goals

References

External links

1985 births
Living people
Sportspeople from Tegucigalpa
Association football midfielders
Honduran footballers
Honduran emigrants to the United States
Honduras international footballers
Honduran expatriate footballers
Footballers at the 2008 Summer Olympics
Olympic footballers of Honduras
Parade High School All-Americans (boys' soccer)
2010 FIFA World Cup players
2011 Copa Centroamericana players
2011 CONCACAF Gold Cup players
L.D. Alajuelense footballers
FC Dallas players
Chivas USA players
C.D. Olimpia players
Club Puebla players
Cruz Azul footballers
Leeds United F.C. players
Scunthorpe United F.C. players
Fort Lauderdale Strikers players
Major League Soccer players
Liga MX players
Liga Nacional de Fútbol Profesional de Honduras players
English Football League players
North American Soccer League players
SMU Mustangs men's soccer players
Expatriate soccer players in the United States
Expatriate footballers in Mexico
Expatriate footballers in England
Expatriate footballers in Costa Rica
FC Dallas draft picks
Liga FPD players
Copa Centroamericana-winning players
W. T. White High School alumni
Major Arena Soccer League players